Kolibri, meaning hummingbird, may refer to:

Technology and engineering
 Kolibri Games, a German gaming company
 2mm Kolibri, a pistol
 Borgward Kolibri, aka Borgward-Focke BFK-1 Kolibri, a German three-seated utility helicopter built by Borgward
 Flettner Fl 282 Kolibri, a German single seat helicopter from World War II
 KolibriOS, a computer operating system
 Zeiss Ikon Kolibri, Kolibri 523/18 was a camera made by Zeiss Ikon between 1930 and 1935
 An experimental storage battery in the Audi A2 vehicle
 A Soviet torpedo

Other
 Kolibri (band), a Russian musical group
 Kolibri (keelboat), a Dutch cabin sailing boat designed in 1963
 Kolibri (video game), a video game for the Sega 32X
 Kolibri Choir, a children's choir
 Night of the Long Knives, a Nazi Germany purge, by code word
 The code name for the character Martin Rauch in the television series Deutschland 83 and sequels

See also
 Colibri (disambiguation)
 Kolibree, French toothbrush company